Joseph Daniel Kern (born September 5, 1976) is an American actor and director.  He is most widely known for his roles in the 2003 films Cabin Fever and Grind.

Early life
Kern was born in Kentucky and was raised in northern Kentucky in the towns of Florence and Independence. In 1995, he graduated from St. Xavier High School in Cincinnati, and subsequently studied at New York University, earning his Bachelor of Fine Arts (BFA) in drama.  While at NYU he studied at the Royal Academy of Dramatic Arts in London.  He started acting on stage with various companies such as Atlantic Theater Company, New Group Theater and Theatre for a New Audience, where he played the title role of Troilus in Shakespeare's Troilus and Cressida directed by Sir Peter Hall.

Career
His feature film debut came in 1999 with the film Die Jungfrau (The Virgin), an Austrian film shot in Austria, Greece and Egypt that cast Kern out of New York City.  He had a guest appearance on the HBO series Sex and the City followed by a role in the Broken Lizards 2001 movie Super Troopers as one of the stoners.  He had a few more roles in some indie films but his career picked up a little in 2002 with the movie Cabin Fever and then in 2003 when Grind was released.  At one point, he had 5 movies in post-production, including The Sasquatch Gang (released in 2007), All the Days Before Tomorrow, and One Part Sugar.

In 2007, Kern co-hosted a week of Attack of the Show on G4. In 2010, he appeared in the TV movie, Playing with Guns, alongside Danny Masterson.

In 2016, Kern was cast in a recurring role on TNT's new drama series Good Behavior, starring Michelle Dockery, which ran two seasons. In 2017, Kern wrote, directed, and starred in Big Bear, which is based on his broken engagement to actress Ginnifer Goodwin.

Personal life
He began dating Ginnifer Goodwin in April 2009. The couple announced their engagement December 24, 2010. They announced their break-up on May 20, 2011.

Filmography

Film

Television

Stage

References

External links
 

1976 births
Male actors from Kentucky
20th-century American male actors
21st-century American male actors
Tisch School of the Arts alumni
St. Xavier High School (Ohio) alumni
Living people